Mosambik Lake is a lake in the Lake Superior drainage basin in Algoma District, Ontario, Canada. The primary inflow is the Magpie River from North Wejinabikun Lake on the west side of the lake, and there are several unnamed creek inflows, including one from Kabiskagami Lake on the southwest side. The primary outflow is also the Magpie River, which flows downstream from the north end of the lake towards Esnagi Lake, and eventually into Lake Superior.

See also
List of lakes in Ontario

References

Lakes of Algoma District